Love and Rockets (often abbreviated L&R) is a comic book series by the Hernandez brothers: Gilbert, Jaime, and Mario. It was one of the first comic books in the alternative comics movement of the 1980s.

The Hernandez brothers produce stories in the series independently of each other.  Gilbert and Jaime produce the majority of the material, and tend to focus on particular casts of characters and settings. Those of Gilbert usually focus on a cast of characters in the fictional Central American village of Palomar; the stories often feature magic realist elements. The Locas stories of Jaime center on a social group in Los Angeles, particularly the Latin-American friends and sometime-lovers Maggie and Hopey.

Publication history
The brothers Gilbert, Jaime, and Mario Hernandez self-published the first issue of Love and Rockets in 1981. In 1982, Fantagraphics Books republished this issue with a color cover. The series was published at magazine size, larger than typical American comic books. Either Gilbert or Jaime, the series' main contributors, would provide the front cover for a given issue, and the other the back; they alternated these duties each issue. The first volume ended with the 50th issue in 1996.  The second volume ran for twenty issues from 2001 to 2007 in standard US comic book size. A third series, Love and Rockets: New Stories, which ran for eight issues, began in 2008, published annually in 100-page, graphic novel-sized issues. In 2016, the series returned to its original, magazine-sized format.

Overview
The Hernandez brothers self-published the first issue of Love and Rockets in 1981, but since 1982 it has been published by Fantagraphics Books. The brothers sent a copy of their self-published comic to The Comics Journal, an imprint of Fantagraphics, for a review. Gary Groth was so impressed with it that the company offered them a publishing deal. The magazine temporarily ceased publication in 1996 after the release of issue #50, while Gilbert and Jaime went on to do separate series involving many of the same characters. However, in 2001 "Los Bros Hernandez" (as they are often referred to) revived the series as Love and Rockets Volume 2.

Love and Rockets contains several ongoing serial narratives, the most prominent being Gilbert's Palomar stories and Jaime's Hoppers 13 (aka Locas) stories. It also contains one-offs, shorter stories, surrealist jokes, and more.

Palomar tells the story of a fictional village in Latin America and its inhabitants. Its vibrant characters and sometimes-fantastic events are sometimes compared to the magical realism literary style of authors such as Gabriel García Márquez and Jorge Luis Borges. The series is also sometimes referred to as Heartbreak Soup, after the first story set in Palomar.

Hoppers 13 follows the tangled lives of a group of primarily chicano characters, from their teenage years in the early days of the California punk scene to the present day. Hoppers, or Huerta, is a fictional city based on the Hernandezes' home town of Oxnard, California. Two memorable members of Jaime's cast are Margarita "Maggie" Luisa Chascarrillo and Esperanza "Hopey" Leticia Glass, whose on-again, off-again romance is a focus for many Hoppers 13 storylines. The series is also often called Locas (Spanish for "crazy women") because of the many quirky female characters depicted.

The original runs of Palomar and Locas have each been collected in recent one-volume editions by Fantagraphics (see Palomar (graphic novel)), although not all of the stories involving "Locas" and "Palomar" characters are contained in these collections. The original fifty-issue Love and Rockets Volume One has also been reprinted in its entirety in both a fifteen-volume paperback library, and more recently a seven-volume mass-market paperback series by Fantagraphics. In addition, several hardcovers collect edited versions of the series tales.

Many attempts have been made to make L&R into a movie, or series of movies. The movie rights had been held up in litigation for over 15 years. Gilbert Hernandez publicly announced in Toronto, Ontario in May 2013 that a deal had been struck to make a movie out of his "Palomar" story-line and that he was currently writing the script.

Characters

Jaime

Margarita Luisa "Maggie" Chascarrillo: called "Perla" by her family; best friend (and occasional girlfriend) of Hopey; otherwise dates men, most prominently Ray Dominguez. She befriended Hopey in the punk rock scene of their southern Californian hometown and briefly becomes a world-travelling mechanic who goes on science-fiction flavored adventures in the early issues. Maggie and Hopey were ranked #95 on Wizard Magazine's 200 Greatest Comic Book Characters of all time.
Esperanza Leticia "Hopey" Glass: sharp-tongued, wild and adventurous best friend of Maggie. A lesbian who plays bass in a series of punk bands, often touring and furthering her adventures/story.
Beatríz "Penny Century" García: bombshell friend to Maggie/Hopey and wife of the ridiculously wealthy H.R. Costigan. She aspires to become a superhero.
Isabel Maria "Izzy" Ortiz Reubens: Friend/mentor to Maggie and a sister of Speedy. Izzy is a writer who suffers a nervous breakdown after a divorce/abortion, becoming a notorious "witch lady" in Hoppers.
Daphne "Daffy" Matsumoto: a rich, naive young friend of Maggie and Hopey who is a prominent supporting character in the early comics, but later goes off to college.
Ray Dominguez: one of Maggie's boyfriends, a painter. Jaime follows his life from Hoppers to LA.
Doyle Blackburn: Ray's childhood friend, who struggles with a history of violence.
Rena "La Toña" Titañon and Vicki Glori: championship rivals in the world of women's Mexican wrestling. Rena is Maggie's friend and (through her many adventures) a loved (and hated) Latin American revolutionary icon. Vicki, later a wrestling coach and league official, is Maggie's aunt and her guardian during her Huerta years.
Danita Lincoln: Maggie's coworker at Vandy's. She dates Ray after Maggie leaves town, also works as a stripper with Doyle's girlfriend Lily.
H.R. Costigan: horned billionaire who has an open marriage with Penny Century.
Theresa "Terry" Downe: talented, cold, pretty guitar player who still pines for ex-girlfriend Hopey.
Rand Race: handsome, world-famous mechanic who hires Maggie and takes her on adventures, oblivious to her crush on him because of his infatuation with former girlfriend Penny Century.
Eulalio "Speedy" Ortiz: Isabel's brother, a member of the local "Hoppers" gang, shared a mutual crush on Maggie until his untimely death. The character is the inspiration for the popular rock group Speedy Ortiz.
Esther Chascarillo: Maggie's younger sister. Maggie calls her "Esther Babies" or "Babies". She has a brief relationship with Speedy.

Gilbert
Luba: no-nonsense, hammer-wielding, promiscuous, enormously busty bañadora (bath giver) who rises to mayor of Palomar and has a complex history before coming to town.
Luba's children: Maricela, Guadalupe, Doralis, Casimira, Socorro, Joselito, Concepción.
Luba's lovers: Archie, Khamo, Peter, Jose.
Ofelia: Luba's cousin who helped raise her and her children.
Heraclio and Carmen: a loving couple who served as central characters for many early Palomar stories.
Israel, Satch, Vicente, Jesús: Heraclio and Pipo's childhood gang of friends.
Chelo: sheriff of Palomar, midwife who delivered many of the main characters.
Pipo, Gato, Sergio: beautiful, vain, successful Pipo; her angry but devoted (ex-)husband Gato, and her son (by Manuel) Sergio, a world-famous soccer star.
Tonantzín Villaseñor: beautiful, hard-partying girl who sells fried babosos (slugs) and later becomes passionately politically active.
Manuel and Soledad: friends/lovers/rivals, stars of the first Palomar story "Heartbreak Soup"
Fritz, Petra, Venus: Fritz and Petra are Luba's long-lost half-sisters who share her voluptuous figure and penchant for adventure. Venus is Petra's precocious, comics-loving daughter.
María: Luba's mother, who abandoned her when she was a toddler. She emigrated to United States and became mother to Fritz and Petra.
Errata Stigmata: a somewhat surreal character who develops stigmata as a reaction to severe emotional trauma. Her first appearance was in "Radio Zero" and her origin is told in "Tears from Heaven".

Landmark stories
This list provides an example of the types of stories that helped Love and Rockets gain critical acclaim.

Jaime
 Mechanics – the original "Maggie the mechanic" story, in which Maggie travels to Africa with a group of mechanics and becomes caught in the middle of a political revolution. Introduced Jaime's artwork and storytelling style.
 The Death of Speedy – Jaime moves away from the "Maggie the mechanic" stories to permanently settle on adventures in Maggie's personal life. Maggie's longtime crush Speedy dies in his car either by suicide or a rival gang (it's left ambiguous). She also begins dating the understated artist Ray.
 Flies on the Ceiling – the story of Izzy Reubens' nervous breakdown in Mexico, where she moves after an abortion and a divorce.
 Wigwam Bam – Hopey leaves Maggie and her hometown of Hoppers to find adventures, dealing with being too old for her punk rock lifestyle.
 Home School – using Peanuts and Dennis the Menace inspired artwork, Jaime tells the story of toddler Maggie and slightly -older Isabel becoming friends under the shadow of fighting parents.
 The Ghost of Hoppers – grown-up Maggie, now an apartment manager in the San Fernando valley, sees visions of ghosts after a creepy visit from Izzy (from Love and Rockets Vol. 2).
 The Love Bunglers – a middle-aged Maggie comes into her own and comes to terms with Hopey and Ray (from Love and Rockets: New Stories #3–4).

Gilbert
 Heartbreak Soup – first Palomar story. Tells the story of notorious ladies' man Manuel, and his affair with beautiful 14-year-old Pipo, and its effect on his friendship with repressed misanthrope Soledad.
 An American in Palomar – a self-important American photographer tries to frame Palomar as a downtrodden, poverty-stricken town to further his own career.
 For the Love of Carmen – a one-issue meditation on the marriage of Heraclio and Carmen Calderon, citizens of Palomar.
 Human Diastrophism (also known as Blood of Palomar) – Palomar's residents hunt for a serial killer as Luba finds herself helplessly in love with a young construction worker, and hard-partying Tonantzín becomes politically active. Published in book form under the title Blood of Palomar.
 Poison River – an immensely complex story of Luba's pre-Palomar life. Details a plot involving the Mexican government, the mob, trans women, racist comic books, and Luba's beauty queen mother and indigenous laborer father.
 Love and Rockets X – mostly set outside of Palomar, a young, white garage band named Love and Rockets runs into racism between blacks and whites; as well as clashes between rich and poor through Los Angeles. Set near the time of the 1992 Los Angeles riots.

Graphic novels and collections
All published at Fantagraphics: Fantagraphics stopped numbering the series after 24. Not included on the list are a trio of books by Gilbert Hernandez depicting the filmography of B movie actress Fritz Martinez, Luba's youngest sister: Chance in Hell (September 2007), The Troublemakers (December 2009) and Love from the Shadows (May 2011).
 Music for Mechanics by Los Bros Hernandez, October 1985, 152 pagesPreface by Carter Scholz
 Chelo's Burden by Los Bros Hernandez, June 1986, 144 pagesPreface by Gary Groth
 Las Mujeres Perdidas by Los Bros Hernandez (only Gilbert and Jaime), August 1987, 160 pages
 Tears from Heaven by Los Bros Hernandez (Gilbert and Jaime; one cover by Mario), January 1988, 136 pages
 House of Raging Women, by Los Bros Hernandez (only Gilbert and Jaime from now on), September 1988, 136 pages
 Duck Feet by Los Bros Hernandez, September 1988, 136 pages
 The Death of Speedy by Jaime Hernandez, November 1989, 136 pages
 Blood of Palomar by Gilbert Hernandez, December 1989, 128 pages
 Flies on the Ceiling by Los Bros Hernandez (principally Jaime), October 1991, 128 pages
 Love and Rockets X by Gilbert Hernandez, July 1993, 72 pages
 Wigwam Bam by Jaime Hernandez, March 1994, 136 pages
 Poison River by Gilbert Hernandez, September 1994, 192 pages
 Chester Square by Jaime Hernandez, July 1996, 160 pages
 Luba Conquers the World by Gilbert Hernandez, December 1996, 136 pages
 Hernandez Satyricon by Los Bros Hernandez (Mario, Gilbert & Jaime Hernandez) August 1997, 160 pages
 Whoa Nellie! by Jaime Hernandez, June 2000, 80 pages
 Fear of Comics by Gilbert Hernandez, October 2000, 120 pages
 Locas in Love by Jaime Hernandez, October 2000, 120 pages (End of Volume 1)
 Luba in America ("Luba", Tome 1), by Gilbert Hernandez, 2001, 168 pages (Beginning of Volume 2)
 Dicks and Deedees by Jaime Hernandez, June 2003, 96 pages
 The Book of Ofelia ("Luba", Tome 2), by Gilbert Hernandez, December 2005, 256 pages
 Ghost of Hoppers by Jaime Hernandez, December 2005, 120 pages
 Three Daughters ("Luba", Tome 3), by Gilbert Hernandez, August 2006, 144 pages
 The Education of Hopey Glass, by Jaime Hernandez, April 2008, 128 pages 
 High Soft Lisp by Gilbert Hernandez, April 2010, 144 pages
 God and Science: Return of the Ti-Girls, by Jaime Hernandez, July 2012, 144 pages 
 Julio's Day by Gilbert Hernandez, April 2013, 112 pages
 The Children of Palomar  by Gilbert Hernandez, August 2013, 104 pages (part of the Ignatz series)
 The Love Bunglers by Jaime Hernandez, April 2014, 100 pages
 Is This How You See Me? by Jaime Hernandez, April 2019, 96 pages
 Tonta by Jaime Hernandez, July 2019, 104 pages
 Maria M. (includes volumes 1 & 2, the first part published November 2013) by Gilbert Hernandez, October 2019, 270 pages

Omnibus editions
Volume 1 was re-released in smaller "omnibus" style trade paperbacks. Starting in 2010, volume 2's stories began getting re-releases as well.  In 2018, the New Stories began being collected among the "omnibus" paperbacks.
 Maggie the Mechanic, by Jaime Hernandez (Locas Book 1, from Volume I), 272 pages (2007)
 The Girl from H.O.P.P.E.R.S., by Jaime Hernandez (Locas Book 2, from Volume I), 272 pages (2007)
 Perla la Loca, by Jaime Hernandez (Locas Book 3, from Volume I), 288 pages (2007)
 Heartbreak Soup, by Gilbert Hernandez (Palomar Book 1, from Volume I), 288 pages (2007)
 Human Diastrophism, by Gilbert Hernandez (Palomar Book 2, from Volume I), 288 pages (2007)
 Beyond Palomar, by Gilbert Hernandez (Palomar Book 3, from Volume I), 256 pages (2007)
 Amor Y Cohetes, by Jaime, Gilbert & Mario Hernandez (Non-Locas and Palomar comics from Volume I), 280 pages (2008) 
 Penny Century, by Jaime Hernandez (Locas Book 4, from the "Penny Century", "Whoa, Nellie!", and "Maggie and Hopey Color Fun" comics, plus Volume II), 240 pages (2010)
 Esperanza, by Jaime Hernandez (Locas Book 5, from Volume II), 248 pages (2011)
 Luba and Her family, by Gilbert Hernandez (Luba Book 1, from Volume II), 312 pages (2014)
 Ofelia, by Gilbert Hernandez (Luba Book 2, from Volume II), 256 pages (2015)
 Comics Dementia, by Gilbert Hernandez (Non-Locas and Palomar comics from Volume I and II), 224 pages (2016)
 Angels and Magpies, by Jaime Hernandez (Locas Book 6, "God and Science: Return of the Ti-Girls" and "The Love Bunglers" from New Stories), 260 pages (2018)
 Three Sisters, by Gilbert Hernandez (Luba book 3, from "Luba: Three Daughters", "High Soft Lisp", and more), 280 pages (2018)
 Children of Palomar & Other Stories, by Gilbert & Mario Hernandez (Palomar book 5, from "Julio's Day", "Children of Palomar, and uncollected non-Palomar stories by Gilbert and Mario), 280 pages (2022)

Hardcovers
Edited segments of both the Palomar and the Maggie stories are available in hardcover format.
 Locas: The Maggie and Hopey Stories by Jaime Hernandez (2004)
 Locas II: Maggie, Hopey, and Ray by Jaime Hernandez (2009)
 Palomar: The Heartbreak Soup Stories by Gilbert Hernandez (2003)
 Luba by Gilbert Hernandez (2009)

New stories
The series continues in annual trade paperbacks, entitled Love & Rockets: New Stories. To date, eight exist:
 New Stories, volume 1, 112 pages (2008)
 New Stories, volume 2, 104 pages (2009)
 New Stories, volume 3, 104 pages (2010)
 New Stories, volume 4, 104 pages (2011)
 New Stories, volume 5, 96 pages (2012)
 New Stories, volume 6, 100 pages (2013)
 New Stories, volume 7, 100 pages (2015)
 New Stories, volume 8, 100 pages (2016)

In 2012, Jaime Hernandez's individual stories from the first two volumes of New Stories were collected into a single volume, entitled God and Science: Return of the Ti-Girls, which also included about 30 new pages of comics.

In 2014, Jaime Hernandez's stories from volumes 3 and 4 of New Stories were collected into a single volume entitled The Love Bunglers.

Volume IV
In 2016, Fantagraphics began releasing Volume IV of Love and Rockets.

References

Works cited

External links
 The Love and Rockets page at Fantagraphics
 A chronology, character list, and many links to reviews and other fan pages
 A review of L&R at PopMatters
 Shelf Life is a Sequart column that often reviews early Love and Rockets books.
 A review of Gilbert's L&R spinoff New Tales of Old Palomar #1 at The Daily Cross Hatch, from March 15, 2007
 Interview with Gilbert Hernandez at The Daily Cross Hatch, from April 2, 2007
 Interview with Gilbert Hernandez, Part 2 at The Daily Cross Hatch, from May 1, 2007
Xicanosmosis A cultural studies essay examining the relationship between the work of Frida Kahlo and Gilbert Hernandez

1981 comics debuts
Comics about women
Comics publications
Fantagraphics titles
Feminist comics
Gilbert Hernandez
Harvey Award winners for Best New Series
Harvey Award winners for Best Continuing or Limited Series
Harvey Award winners for Best Single Issue or Story
Jaime Hernandez
LGBT-related comics
Punk comics
Magic realism